Josiah Quincy (March 7, 1793  – January 19, 1875) was an American politician and lawyer who served as the President of the New Hampshire Senate.

Quincy was born March 7, 1793, in Lenox, Massachusetts, and moved to Rumney, New Hampshire, after being admitted to the bar.

Quincy died on January 19, 1875, in Rumney.

Notes

1793 births
1875 deaths
Members of the New Hampshire House of Representatives
New Hampshire state senators
Presidents of the New Hampshire Senate
New Hampshire lawyers
19th-century American politicians
People from Lenox, Massachusetts
People from Rumney, New Hampshire
19th-century American lawyers